Banka Cheema (Pronounced: Beanka Cheema and Benka Chima), is a village and Union Council of Wazirabad Tehsil, Gujranwala District, in Pakistan's Punjab province. A Post Office is functional in Banka Cheema by Pakistan Post under Government of Pakistan for receiving important mails, documents, money orders and product delivery. For education in the village a Government Primary School Banka Cheema, Government Girls High School (GGHS) Banka Cheema is functional, by Government of Punjab, Pakistan under Board of Intermediate and Secondary Education, Gujranwala. The only way to reach Banka Cheema is by Road. 97% population of the town is Muslim, while remaining 3% is non-Muslim.

References

Villages in Gujranwala District
Populated places in Wazirabad Tehsil
Union councils of Wazirabad Tehsil